USCGC Bittersweet (WLB 389) was a C or Iris-class 180-foot buoy tender of the United States Coast Guard.

Built by the Zenith Dredge Company of Duluth, Minnesota, the ship was laid down on 16 September 1943, and launched on 11 November 1943. Commissioned on 11 May 1944, Bittersweet was assigned to the 17th Coast Guard District, and sailed for Alaska via the St. Lawrence River, the Panama Canal and San Francisco, arriving on 19 November 1944.

Based at Kodiak, her primary mission was the performance of general aids to navigation (ATON) duties, but she also carried out numerous search and rescue operations, fought fires, delivered medical supplies, and enforced fishing laws.

At the end of the war in September 1945, in addition continuing her ATON duties, Bittersweet was now charged with the performance of law enforcement duties. Kodiak remained the ship's homeport until 30 June 1964 when it changed to Ketchikan. She remained there until mid-1976 when the ship underwent major renovations at the Coast Guard Yard at Curtis Bay, Maryland.

Bittersweet was then stationed at Woods Hole, Massachusetts and used for ATON and icebreaking. In addition she took part in oil spill cleanup operations and also participated in the International Ice Patrol, collecting hydrographic and drift buoy data off the Grand Banks using a mobile laboratory.

Bittersweet was decommissioned on 18 August 1997, and given to Estonia. Renamed Valvas, the ship served in the Estonian Border Guard until it was decommissioned in July 2014 and given to the Estonian Maritime Museum. It is to become a museum ship.

Design
The Iris-class buoy tenders were constructed after the Mesquite-class buoy tenders. It was powered by one electric motor. This was connected up to two Westinghouse generators which were driven by two CooperBessemer GND-8 four-cycle diesel engines. It had a single screw.

The ship had a complement of six officers and seventy-four crew members in 1945; this decreased to two warrants, four officers, and forty-seven men in 1966. It was fitted with a SL1 radar system and QBE-3A sonar system in 1945. Its armament consisted of one 3"/50 caliber gun, two 20mm/80 guns, two Mousetraps, two depth charge tracks, and four Y-guns in 1945; these were removed in 1966.

References

External links

Iris-class seagoing buoy tenders
1943 ships
Historic American Engineering Record in Massachusetts
Museum ships in Estonia
Ships built in Duluth, Minnesota
Ships transferred from the United States Coast Guard to the Estonian Border Guard